The Kingmaker is a Big Finish Productions audio drama based on the long-running British science fiction television series Doctor Who. The drama was written by Nev Fountain, who is best known for his work on the BBC radio and television comedy series Dead Ringers, and guest stars Jon Culshaw, who in that series is known for his impression of Tom Baker as the Fourth Doctor.

The Doctor travels to the year 1485, to investigate the mystery of the Princes in the Tower, in order to fulfil a contract to write a series of children's books. Is there another time traveller on the loose? And just why is there a robot in the TARDIS?

Plot
This is a historical serial in four episodes, concerning the murder by King Richard III of the Princes in the Tower, set mainly in the year 1485. The Doctor is investigating the death of the Princes because it is a genuine historical mystery. He visits Shakespeare, in the 16th century, to learn as much background as he can from the author of the most famous play based on the life of Richard III, before taking the more dangerous step of a landing in 1485.

Performance and Context
Starring Peter Davison, The Kingmaker is written by professional scriptwriter Nev Fountain, best known as writer of the radio comedy series Dead Ringers for BBC Radio 4. Moreover one of the principal guest stars in this story is the Dead Ringers actor and impressionist Jon Culshaw.

The script has some elements which spoof The Hitchhikers Guide to the Galaxy (there is a robot which evokes memories of Marvin, the Paranoid Android); it has William Shakespeare (complete with a humorous, but authentic, cod-Birmingham accent); and it has King Richard III (both the character in Shakespeare's play, and the actual king in 1485). It also has Jon Culshaw doing, at one point, his famous impression of Tom Baker as the 4th Doctor. Culshaw also gives a performance as King Richard's brother in law, Earl Rivers.

Cast
The Doctor — Peter Davison
Peri — Nicola Bryant
Erimem — Caroline Morris
Richard, Duke of Gloucester/Richard III — Stephen Beckett
Earl Rivers/Voice of the Fourth Doctor — Jon Culshaw
Mr Seyton — Michael Fenton Stevens
Henry, Duke of Buckingham — Marcus Hutton
Judith — Linzi Matthews
Sir James Tyrell — Chris Neill
Clarrie — Arthur Smith
Susan — Katie Wimpenny

Notes
Jon Culshaw does his famous Tom Baker impression when the Fifth Doctor listens to the Fourth Doctor's dictated notes for the incomplete (and fictional) work "Doctor Who Discovers Historical Mysteries".
This audio drama features the appearance of a new series Doctor as, in a way, the Ninth Doctor is part of the plot.

Critical reception
Matt Michael, reviewing the audio for Doctor Who Magazine, criticised it strongly, calling it "over-engineered and overlong", and saying that it "can't make its mind up whether it wants to be comedy or tragedy, and ends up doing neither very well."

References

External links
Big Finish Productions – ''The Kingmaker

2006 audio plays
Fourth Doctor audio plays
Fifth Doctor audio plays
Doctor Who multi-Doctor stories
Fiction set in the 1480s